Pratt Miller Engineering, also known as Pratt & Miller, is an American company involved in the automotive and arms industries. It was founded by Gary Pratt and Jim Miller in 1989. A defense division was added in 2013 and the company was acquired by Oshkosh Corporation in 2020. The company is headquartered in the unincorporated community of New Hudson, in Lyon Township, Oakland County, Michigan. They are best known as service providers for many of General Motors' motorsports programs, including the operation of the Corvette Racing team.

Racing history
Since their alliance with GM, Pratt & Miller have won numerous championships and famous racing events. Corvette Racing has won their class at the 24 Hours of Le Mans eight times, claimed the overall victory at the Rolex 24 at Daytona in 2001, and won seven straight American Le Mans Series championships. Team Cadillac won seven Pirelli World Challenge championships, while The Racer's Group, running Pratt & Miller-built Pontiac GTO.Rs, won the Rolex Sports Car Series championship in 2006. GM Racing's Katech-built LS7.R small-block engine was also named the 2006 Global Motorsport Engine of the Year. Katech built the C5-R and LS7.R engines that powered the C5-R and C6.R Corvettes in the GTS/GT1 classes of ALMS and the 24 Hours of Le Mans.  After Le Mans 2009, Corvette Racing switched to the GT2 class and decided to bring the engine builds in-house. Corvette Racing won the 2012 and 2013 American Le Mans Series GT Team's and Manufacturer's Championships.

Pratt & Miller developed a road-going tuned version of the Chevrolet Corvette C6 named C6RS.  The C6RS was powered by a 500 cubic inch LS-based engine developed and built by Katech Inc.

One of the company's first products was the Intrepid RM-1 GTP car, built in 1991.

Cars
Intrepid RM-1 (GTP)Chevrolet Corvette C5-R (GTS/GT1)Pontiac GTO.Rs (Grand-Am GT)Chevrolet Camaro GT (Grand-Am GT)Cadillac CTS-V (Pirelli World Challenge GT)Chevrolet Corvette C6.R (GT1, GT2)Cadillac ATS-V.R GT3 (Pirelli World Challenge GT)Chevrolet Corvette C7.R (IMSA GTLM and LM GTE)Chevrolet Corvette C8.R (IMSA GTLM/GTD Pro and LM GTE)

Championships and Major Victories
American Le Mans Series: 2001 GTS, 2002 GTS, 2003 GTS, 2004 GTS, 2005 GT1, 2006 GT1, 2007 GT1, 2008 GT1, 2012 GT, 2013 GT
Pirelli World Challenge:  2012 GT, 2013 GT, 2014 GT, 2015 GT Driver
IMSA WeatherTech SportsCar Championship: 2016 GTLM, 2017 GTLM, 2018 GTLM, 2020 GTLM, 2021 GTLM
24 Hours of Le Mans: 2001 GTS, 2002 GTS, 2004 GTS, 2005 GT1, 2006 GT1, 2009 GT1, 2011 LMGTE Pro, 2015 LMGTE Pro
24 Hours of Daytona: 2001 GT/overall, 2015 GTLM, 2016 GTLM, 2021 GTLM
12 Hours of Sebring: 2002 GTS, 2003 GTS, 2004 GTS, 2006 GT1, 2007 GT1, 2008 GT1, 2009 GT1, 2013 GT, 2015 GTLM, 2016 GTLM, 2017 GTLM, 2022 GTD Pro

References

External links
 Pratt Miller
 Corvette Racing 
 Team Cadillac

Companies established in 1989
American auto racing teams
Chevrolet Corvette
24 Hours of Le Mans teams
American Le Mans Series teams
European Le Mans Series teams
American racecar constructors
WeatherTech SportsCar Championship teams
FIA World Endurance Championship teams